Oleh Anatolyevich Taran (born 11 January 1960) is a Ukrainian footballer coach and former player. He was a prolific forward who possessed a powerful shot and was capable of dribbling quickly and precisely. In 1983, he was named the Ukrainian Footballer of the Year.

Honours

Player
Dnipro Dnipropetrovsk
 Soviet Top League: 1983, 1988; runner-up silver 1987; runner-up bronze 1984, 1985

'Wydad Casablanca
 Moroccan League: 1990

Individual
 Ukrainian Footballer of the Year: 1983

Coach
Kryvbas Kryvyi Rih
 Ukrainian Premier League runner-up bronze: 1998–99, 1999–2000
 Ukrainian Cup runner-up: 1999–2000

External links
 
 Profile on UkrSoccerHistory.com
 Profile on football.odessa.ua
 Profile on legioner.kulichki.com
 

1960 births
Living people
People from Pokrov, Ukraine
Sportspeople from Dnipropetrovsk Oblast
Ukrainian footballers
Soviet footballers
Association football forwards
Soviet Top League players
Ukrainian Premier League players
Division 2 (Swedish football) players
Hapoel Tzafririm Holon F.C. players
Liga Leumit players
SC Odesa players
FC Dnipro players
FC Chornomorets Odesa players
FC Dynamo Kyiv players
FC Metalurh Zaporizhzhia players
PFC CSKA Moscow players
Wydad AC players
FC Enerhiya Nova Kakhovka players
FC Dustlik players
Ukrainian football managers
Ukrainian Premier League managers
Ukrainian Second League managers
Slovak Super Liga managers
FC Kryvbas Kryvyi Rih managers
FC Metalurh Zaporizhzhia managers
ŠK Slovan Bratislava managers
Soviet expatriate footballers
Ukrainian expatriate footballers
Ukrainian expatriate football managers
Soviet expatriate sportspeople in Morocco
Expatriate footballers in Morocco
Soviet expatriate sportspeople in Israel
Expatriate footballers in Israel
Ukrainian expatriate sportspeople in Sweden
Expatriate footballers in Sweden
Ukrainian expatriate sportspeople in Germany
Expatriate footballers in Germany
Ukrainian expatriate sportspeople in Uzbekistan
Expatriate footballers in Uzbekistan
Ukrainian expatriate sportspeople in Slovakia
Expatriate football managers in Slovakia